The 2014–15 Barys Astana season is the Kontinental Hockey League franchise's 7th season of play and 16th season overall.

Current roster

Farm teams
Nomad Astana (Kazakhstan Hockey Championship)
Snezhnye Barsy (Junior Hockey League)

See also
2014–15 KHL season

References

Barys Astana seasons
Barys Astana
Barys